Əsgərbəyli (also Askerbeyli) is a village and municipality in the Sabirabad Rayon of Azerbaijan.  It has a population of 990.

References 

Populated places in Sabirabad District